USS Absegami (SP-371) was a motorboat acquired on a free lease by the United States Navy during World War I. She was outfitted as an armed patrol craft and assigned to patrol the Delaware River from Philadelphia, Pennsylvania, to Cape May, New Jersey on the Delaware Bay. When the Navy found her excess to their needs, she was returned to her former owner.

Construction and career

Built in New York
Absegami was a motor boat built in 1916 at New York City by the New York Yacht, Launch & Engine Co.; acquired by the Navy on free lease from her owner, Allen K. White, Atlantic City, New Jersey, on 2 May 1917; and commissioned at the Philadelphia Navy Yard on 30 April 1917, Ensign W. G. Morse .

World War I service
Following her commissioning, Absegami was assigned to section patrol duty in the 4th Naval District. Throughout World War I, the boat patrolled the Delaware Bay and Atlantic Ocean waters off Cape May, New Jersey. Absegami was decommissioned at Philadelphia on 2 December 1918 and returned to her owner four days later.

Gallery

Notes

References

Books
 
Online sources

External links
 USS Absegami (SP-371), 1917–1918. Originally the Civilian Motor Boat Absegami

World War I auxiliary ships of the United States
Patrol vessels of the United States Navy
Ships built in New York City
1916 ships
Ships built by the New York Yacht, Launch & Engine Company